Procochleosaurus is an extinct genus of cochleosaurid temnospondyl. Known from the Jarrow coal mines of Ireland, this genus is the oldest known member of the family Cochleosauridae. It was quite similar to Cochleosaurus, an early temnospondyl from the Czech Republic.

See also
 Prehistoric amphibian
 List of prehistoric amphibians

References

Cochleosauridae
Prehistoric amphibian genera